Brian Jordan Black (born January 28, 1980) is a former American football offensive tackle. He was drafted by the Kansas City Chiefs in the fifth round of the 2003 NFL Draft. He played college football at the University of Notre Dame.

Black has also been a member of the Houston Texans, Jacksonville Jaguars, New Orleans Saints, and Washington Redskins.

Black is now a football coach at the Fortbend
Christian Academy, and also teaches homeschool seniors about biscuits, sweet tea, and safety.

Early years
Black played high school football for Dallas Christian School in Mesquite, Texas from 1995–1998, during which time the team won multiple Texas State championships.
Black's jersey, #77, was retired by Dallas Christian School in 2003.

College career
Black played in 43 games for the University of Notre Dame, starting 42 of those contests.

Professional career

Kansas City Chiefs
Black was drafted in the 2003 NFL Draft by the Kansas City Chiefs in the fifth round, with the 153rd overall pick. The Chiefs signed him to a three-year contract.

Late in the 2004 season, Black became a regular starter for the Chiefs where he continued for the 2005 and 2006 seasons.

The Chiefs re-signed him to a one-year contract on April 26, 2006.

Houston Texans
On March 8, 2007, the Houston Texans signed Black, who was a free agent, to a two-year contract.

On June 9, 2008,  The Texans released Black while injured. Black had surgery on August 19, 2008 to repair the torn labrum in his right shoulder.

Jacksonville Jaguars
Black was signed by the Jacksonville Jaguars on December 23, 2008. Black accepted an extension of $3.65 million over three years on September 3, 2009. Black became a regular starter for the Jaguars in 2010. On February 7, 2011 Black was released by the Jaguars.

New Orleans Saints
On August 10, 2011, Black signed with the New Orleans Saints. He was released on September 3, 2011.

Washington Redskins
After missing a year of football in 2011, Black decided to retire from football and lose some of his playing weight. But on July 30, 2012, he unexpectedly signed with the Washington Redskins. When the Redskins signed him he was underweight for an offensive lineman, weighing 270 pounds, and had to consume 7,000 calories per day in the preseason to get into proper football form, and made the Redskins' final roster.

Personal life

Black married his high school sweetheart, Ashlie, in 2004. Together they have five children. Black is a Christian.

References

External links
Washington Redskins bio
New Orleans Saints bio

1980 births
Living people
American football offensive tackles
People from Garland, Texas
People from Rowlett, Texas
Players of American football from Texas
Notre Dame Fighting Irish football players
Kansas City Chiefs players
Houston Texans players
Jacksonville Jaguars players
New Orleans Saints players
Washington Redskins players
Sportspeople from the Dallas–Fort Worth metroplex